Marquess of Comillas is a hereditary title in the Peerage of Spain, accompanied by the dignity of Grandee of Spain. On 3 July 1878, the title Marquess of Comillas was granted to Antonio López y López by the King Alfonso XII, in recognition of his contribution to the town of Comillas in northern Spain. The title recalls the name of his hometown.

The first Marquess of Comillas built a gothic palace in Comillas in 1888. Its architect was Joan Martorell, renowned Catalan architect. The Palace of Sobrellano, as it is known, was the first building in Spain to make use of electrical lighting, patented by Thomas Edison a year before its construction.

As of 2018, Juan Alfonso Güell y Martos is the current Marquess of Comillas, also styled as Count of San Pedro de Ruiseñada.

Marquesses of Comillas (1878)
 Antonio López y López, 1st Marquess of Comillas (1878–1883)
 Claudio López y Bru, 2nd Marquess of Comillas (1883-1925), son of the 1st Marquess
 Juan Antonio Güell y López, 3rd Marquess of Comillas (1925-1958), grandson of the 1st Marquess
 Juan Alfonso Güell y Martos, 4th Marquess of Comillas (1958-), grandson of the 3rd Marquess

See also
List of current Grandees of Spain

References

Marquessates in the Spanish nobility